Three ships of the United States Navy have been named USS Des Moines, after the city of Des Moines, Iowa.

 , a  heavy cruiser, was renamed  on 6 November 1944.
 , the lead ship of her class, was a heavy cruiser in service from 1948 to 1961 and scrapped between 2006 and 2007.

United States Navy ship names